The Chinese telegraph code, Chinese telegraphic code, or Chinese commercial code ( or ) is a four-digit decimal code (character encoding) for electrically telegraphing messages written with Chinese characters.

Encoding and decoding 
A codebook is provided for encoding and decoding the Chinese telegraph code. It shows one-to-one correspondence between Chinese characters and four-digit numbers from 0000 to 9999. Chinese characters are arranged and numbered in dictionary order according to their radicals and strokes. Each page of the book shows 100 pairs of a Chinese character and a number in a 10×10 table. The most significant two digits of a code matches the page number, the next digit matches the row number, and the least significant digit matches the column number, with 1 being the column on the far right. For example, the code 0022 for the character  (zhōng), meaning “center,” is given in page 00, row 2, column 2 of the codebook, and the code 2429 for the character  (wén), meaning “script,” is given in page 24, row 2, column 9. The PRC’s Standard Telegraph Codebook (Ministry of Post and Telecommunications 2002) provides codes for approximately 7,000 Chinese characters.

Senders convert their messages written with Chinese characters to a sequence of digits according to the codebook. For instance, the phrase  (Zhōngwén xìnxī), meaning “information in Chinese,” is rendered into the code as 0022 2429 0207 1873. It is transmitted using the Morse code. Receivers decode the Morse code to get a sequence of digits, chop it into an array of quadruplets, and then decode them one by one referring to the book. Due to lack of non-digit characters, the Morse codes for digits could be simplified, for example one several consequent dashes could be replaced with a single one.

The codebook also defines codes for Zhuyin alphabet, Latin alphabet, Cyrillic alphabet, and various symbols including special symbols for months, days in a month, and hours.

Senders may translate their messages into numbers by themselves, or pay a small charge to have them translated by a telegrapher. Chinese expert telegraphers used to remember several thousands of codes of the most frequent use.

The Standard Telegraph Codebook gives alternative three-letter code (AAA, AAB, ...) for Chinese characters. It compresses telegram messages and cuts international fees by 25% as compared to the four-digit code.

Use
Looking up a character given a number is straightforward: page, row, column.
However, looking up a number given a character is more difficult, as it requires analyzing the character. The Four-Corner Method was developed in the 1920s to allow people to more easily look up characters by the shape, and remains in use today as a Chinese input method for computers.

History 

The first telegraph code for Chinese was brought into use soon after the Great Northern Telegraph Company ( /  Dàběi Diànbào Gōngsī) introduced telegraphy to China in 1871. Septime Auguste Viguier, a Frenchman and customs officer in Shanghai, published a codebook (Viguier 1872), succeeding Danish astronomer Hans Carl Frederik Christian Schjellerup’s earlier work.

In consideration of the former code’s insufficiency and disorder of characters, Zheng Guanying compiled a new codebook in 1881. It remained in effect until the Ministry of Transportation and Communications printed a new book in 1929. In 1933, a supplement was added to the book.

After the establishment of the People’s Republic of China in 1949, the codebook forked into two different versions, due to revisions made in the Mainland China and Taiwan independently from each other. The Mainland version, the Standard Telegraph Codebook, adopted the simplified Chinese characters in 1983.

Application 
The Chinese telegraph code can be used for a Chinese input method for computers. Ordinary computer users today hardly master it because it needs a lot of rote memorization. However, the related Four-Corner Method, which allows one to look up characters by shape, is used.

Both the Hong Kong and Macau Resident Identity Cards display the Chinese telegraph code for the holder’s Chinese name. Business forms provided by the government and corporations in Hong Kong often require filling out telegraph codes for Chinese names. The codes help to input Chinese characters into a computer. When filling up the DS-160 form for the US Visa, the Chinese telegraph codes are required if the applicant has a name in Chinese characters.

Chinese telegraph code is used extensively in law enforcement investigations worldwide that involve ethnic Chinese subjects where variant phonetic spellings of Chinese names can create confusion. Dialectical differences (Mr. Wu in Mandarin becomes Mr. Ng in Cantonese (吳先生); while Mr. Wu in Cantonese would become Mr. Hu in Mandarin (胡先生)) and differing romanization systems (Mr. Xiao in the Hanyu Pinyin system, and Mr. Hsiao in the Wade–Giles system) can create serious problems for investigators, but can be remedied by application of Chinese telegraph code. For instance, investigators following a subject in Taiwan named Hsiao Ai-Kuo might not know this is the same person known in mainland China as Xiao Aiguo and Hong Kong as Siu Oi-Kwok until codes are checked for the actual Chinese characters to determine all match as CTC: 5618/1947/0948 for 萧爱国 (simplified) / 蕭愛國 (traditional).

See also 
 Code point
 Four-Corner Method, a 4-digit structural encoding method designed to aid lookup of telegraph codes
 Telegraph code
 Wiktionary page of Standard Telegraph Codebook (标准电码本（修订本）), 1983

Notes

References and bibliography 

 Baark, Erik. 1997. Lightning Wires: The Telegraph and China’s Technological Modernization, 1860–1890. Greenwood Press. .
 Baark, Erik. 1999. “Wires, codes, and people: The Great Northern Telegraph Company in China.” In China and Denmark: Relations Since 1674, edited by Kjeld Erik Brødsgaard and Mads Kirkebæk, Nordic Institute of Asian Studies, pp. 119–152. .
 Immigration Department of Hong Kong. 2006. Card face design of a smart identity card. Hong Kong Special Administrative District Government. Accessed on December 22, 2006.
 Jacobsen, Kurt. 1997. “Danish watchmaker created the Chinese Morse system.” Morsum Magnificat, 51, pp. 14–19.
 Lín Jìnyì ( / ), editor. 1984.  Kanji denpō kōdo henkan hyō [Chinese character telegraph code conversion table] (In Japanese). Tokyo: KDD Engineering & Consulting.
 Ministry of Post and Telecommunications ( /  Zhōngyāng Rénmín Zhèngfǔ Yóudiànbù), editor. 1952.  /  Biāozhǔn diànmǎběn [Standard telegraph codebook], 2nd edition (In Chinese). Beijing: Ministry of Post and Telecommunications.
 Ministry of Post and Telecommunications ( Zhōnghuá Rénmín Gònghéguó Yóudiànbù), editor. 2002.  Biāozhǔn diànmǎběn [Standard telegraph codebook],  xiūdìngběn [revised edition] (In Chinese). Beijing:  Rénmín Yóudiàn Chūbǎnshè [People’s Post and Telecommunications Publishing]. .
 Reeds, James A. 2004. Chinese telegraph code (CTC). Accessed on December 25, 2006.
 Shanghai City Local History Office ( Shànghǎi Shì Dìfāngzhì Bàngōngshì). 2004.  Zhuānyèzhì: Shànghǎi yóudiànzhì [Industrial history: Post and communications history in Shanghai] (In Chinese). Accessed on December 22, 2006.
 Stripp, Alan. 2002. Codebreaker in the Far East. Oxford University Press. .
 Tianjin Communications Corporation. 2004.  Zīfèi biāozhǔn: Guónèi gōngzhòng diànbào yèwù [Rate standards: Domestic public telegraph service] (In Chinese). Accessed on December 26, 2006.
 Viguier, Septime Auguste ( /  Wēijīyè). 1872.  /  Diànbào xīnshū [New book for the telegraph] (In Chinese). Published in Shanghai.
 Viguier, Septime Auguste ( /  Wēijīyè) and Dé Míngzài. 1871.  /  Diànxìn xīnfǎ [New method for the telegraph] (In Chinese).
 Yasuoka Kōichi and Yasuoka Motoko. 1997. Why is “” included in JIS X 0221? (In Japanese). IPSJ SIG Technical Report, 97-CH-35, pp. 49–54.
 Yasuoka Kōichi and Yasuoka Motoko. 2006.  Moji fugō no rekishi: Ōbei to Nippon hen [A history of character codes in Japan, America, and Europe] (In Japanese). Tokyo:  Kyōritsu Shuppan .

External links 
 Chinese Commercial/Telegraph Code Lookup by NJStar
  Standard telegraph code (Chinese commercial code) 
 Unihan database from Unicode Consortium: includes mappings between Unicode and Mainland or Taiwan versions of the telegraph code (kMainlandTelegraph, kTaiwanTelegraph, in ).

Encodings
Morse code